Hissey is a surname. Notable people with the surname include:

Jane Hissey (born 1952), English writer and illustrator
Michael Hissey, Australian musician, educator, and conductor

See also
Hussey